Pemigewasset House was a grand hotel in Plymouth, New Hampshire. It began as a tavern in 1800. In 1841 Denison Burnam turned it into Pemigewasset House, and it tripled in size by 1859 with a grand dining room and railroad depot among the additions. A fire destroyed it in 1862, and a new four-story hotel was constructed on the site. It was served by the Boston, Concord, & Maine Railroad with its own depot. Guests included President Franklin Pierce, a regular, and Nathaniel Hawthorne who died at the hotel. It, too, was destroyed by fire in 1909.

References

Defunct hotels in New Hampshire
Buildings and structures in Grafton County, New Hampshire
Hotel buildings completed in 1841
Plymouth, New Hampshire
1841 establishments in New Hampshire
1909 disestablishments in New Hampshire
Buildings and structures demolished in 1862
Buildings and structures demolished in 1909
Demolished buildings and structures in New Hampshire